Shazam may refer to:

Comic book franchise
 Captain Marvel (DC Comics), also known as Shazam, a superhero character published by Fawcett Comics and DC Comics
 Shazam (wizard), a character from the Shazam!/Captain Marvel comics, who gives the superhero and his associates their powers
 Shazam!, a scrambler-style theme park ride based on DC's Shazam character, located at Six Flags St. Louis, Missouri, U.S.
 Shazam! (TV series), 1974-77 live-action television series based on the comic book franchise
 The Kid Super Power Hour with Shazam! a 1981 Saturday morning cartoon series segment based on the comic book franchise
 Shazam! The Monster Society of Evil, a 2007 limited-edition DC Comics series
 Shazam! (film), 2019 superhero film based on the comic book franchise
 Shazam! Fury of the Gods, 2023 superhero film and sequel to the 2019 film

Other uses in arts and media

 "Shazam!" (Duane Eddy song), a 1960 song by Duane Eddy
 Shazam (album), a 1970 LP by The Move
 Shazam! (New Zealand TV series) a New Zealand youth music programme from the 1980s
 "Shazam!" (Spiderbait song), a song by Spiderbait from their 1999 album Grand Slam
 "Shazam!", a song by the Beastie Boys from their 2004 album To the 5 Boroughs
 "Shazam!", original title for Attack Attack!'s second album Attack Attack!
 "Shazam", a catch-phrase used by the character Gomer Pyle in The Andy Griffith Show and Gomer Pyle, U.S.M.C.
 Beat Shazam, a 2010s-2020s TV game show based on the song-recognition app
 Foxy Shazam, a rock band

Other uses
 Shazam (application), a music recognition app on Android and iPhone
 SHAZAM (interbank network), financial services and payments processing company
 SHAZAM (software), software package for econometrics and statistics

See also
 Chazzan, a Jewish musician, or precentor, trained in the vocal arts
 Shazzan, an American animated series from 1967 to 1969, about a genie with magical powers
 Kazaam, a 1996 American comedy film about a genie with magical powers, played by Shaquille O'Neal
Shazaam, an apocryphal 1990s film starring comedian Sinbad as a genie, likely a misremembering of Kazaam via the Mandela effect
 Kazaa, a peer-to-peer file sharing application
 ShahZaM, the moniker for Shahzeb Khan, a professional Counter-Strike: Global Offensive player